Michael Walsh Cluskey (1832 – January 13, 1873) was a Confederate politician who served in the Confederate States Congress during the American Civil War.

Biography
Cluskey was born in Chatham County, Georgia. During the Civil War, he was an assistant quartermaster in the Confederate States Army and eventually rose to the rank of colonel. He was elected to represent Tennessee in the Second Confederate Congress from 1864 to 1865.

He was interred at Mount Olivet Cemetery in Washington, D.C.

Notes

External links
The Political Graveyard
Guide to the Reuben T. Durrett Collection of Michael Walsh Cluskey Papers 1857-1871 at the University of Chicago Special Collections Research Center

1832 births
1873 deaths
Members of the Confederate House of Representatives from Tennessee
19th-century American politicians
People of Georgia (U.S. state) in the American Civil War
Confederate States Army officers
People from Chatham County, Georgia
Burials at Mount Olivet Cemetery (Washington, D.C.)